In season 2006–07, Clyde competed in their seventh consecutive season in the Scottish First Division. Joe Miller was appointed as new manager, after Graham Roberts was dismissed for gross misconduct on a tour of Canada. In a subsequent court case Roberts was awarded £32,000 compensation for unfair dismissal.

Clyde finished fifth in the Scottish First Division, and reached their first cup final for 48 years, in the Scottish Challenge Cup. They went out of the Scottish League Cup in the first round and the Scottish Cup in the third round.

Transfers

May to December
In:

Out:

January to April
In:

Out:

Squad

Results

Friendlies

Scottish First Division

Scottish Challenge Cup

Scottish League Cup

Scottish Cup

Player statistics

League table

Notes

Clyde F.C. seasons
Clyde